Don't Stop Believin is the eighth studio album by British-Australian singer Olivia Newton-John, released on 30 October 1976. The album received a Gold certification by the Recording Industry Association of America (RIAA) and reached number 33 on the US Billboard 200 and number seven on the US Top Country Albums chart.

The first single released from the album was the title track, which peaked at number 33 on the US Billboard Hot 100 and number one on the US Adult Contemporary chart. "Every Face Tells a Story" ended Newton-John's streak of seven consecutive number-one Adult Contemporary hits. "Every Face Tells a Story" also ended her streak of nine consecutive Top 40 hits. "Sam" was Newton-John's highest-charting hit on the Billboard Hot 100 since the number 13 peak of "Something Better to Do", and was also her seventh Dutch chart-topping single.

A live album recorded on the promotional tour for Don't Stop Believin, Love Performance, was released in Japan in 1981, the LP vinyl sold 123,590 and the cassette 10,600 copies there.

Reception
Cashbox said "Olivia Newton-John's LPs are always greeted with much consumer and industry excitement upon release, and this should be no exception. The title track is already making waves as a single offering, which shouldn't hurt sales at all. John Farrar's production, like the last album, is ultimately sensitive to Newton-John's needs: the instrumentation is sharp, and gives her emotive voice direction, and, at the same time, room to move. Look for 'Every Face Tells a Story' and 'A Thousand Conversations' to get serious play as album cuts. As always, the record will suit tastes across the board: pop, soft-rock, MOR, and country."

Track listing

Personnel
 

Musicians
 Olivia Newton-John – lead and backing vocals
 Shane Keister – keyboards
 Warren Oates – clavinet (4)
 Chris Christian – acoustic guitar
 John Farrar – acoustic guitar, electric guitars, backing vocals
 Steve Gibson – acoustic guitar
 Weldon Myrick – steel guitar (5)
 Joe Osborn – bass 
 Larrie Londin – drums, percussion
 Charlie McCoy – harmonica (8)
 Bergen White – string arrangements
 Shelly Kurland String Section – strings
 Donna Fein – backing vocals
 Muffy Hendrix – backing vocals
 Lisa Silver – backing vocals
 Hurshel Wiginton – bass vocals (9)

Production
 Produced and arranged by John Farrar
 Recorded at Creative Workshop, (Nashville, Tennessee)
 Recording engineer – Brent Maher
 Mixed at Cherokee Studios (Los Angeles, California)
 Mixing – Bill Schnee
 Assistant engineer – George Tutko
 Mastered by Mike Reese at The Mastering Lab (Los Angeles, California)

Design
 Cover photos – Charles Bush
 Black and white photos – Jeff Dunas
 Art direction and design – George Osaki
 Costume design/wardrobe/stylist – Fleur Thiemeyer

Charts and certifications

Weekly charts

Year-end charts

Certifications and sales

References

1976 albums
Olivia Newton-John albums
Albums produced by John Farrar
MCA Records albums